The women's 1000 metres in speed skating at the 1994 Winter Olympics took place on 23 February, at the Hamar Olympic Hall.

Records
Prior to this competition, the existing world and Olympic records were as follows:

Results

References

Women's speed skating at the 1994 Winter Olympics
Skat